France–Lebanon relations are the international relations between France and Lebanon. France, the former colonial power, enjoys friendly relations with Lebanon and has often provided support to the Lebanese. The French language is widely spoken fluently throughout Lebanon and is taught as well as used as a medium of education in many Lebanese schools. Both nations are members of the Francophonie.

History

French Colonialism

In 1920, soon after the end of World War I, the League of Nations mandated that Lebanon would be administered by France after the Partition of the Ottoman Empire. Lebanon officially became part of the French colonial empire, as part of the French Mandate for Syria and Lebanon, and was administered from Damascus. From November 1929 to November 1931, Charles de Gaulle was posted as General Staff of the Levant Troops in Beirut.

During World War II, Lebanon was initially administered by Vichy France. By 1942, the territory came under Free France. In August of that same year, General De Gaulle returned to Lebanon, to meet with the occupying British forces who had entered the territory to prevent German advances into the Levant. In March 1943, using the 1932 census, France distributed seats in the Lebanese parliament on a ratio of six-to-five in favor of Christians. This was later extended to other public offices. The president was to be a Maronite Christian, the prime minister a Sunni Muslim, and the Speaker of the Chamber of Deputies a Shia Muslim. In January 1944, France agreed to transfer power to the Lebanese government, thus granting the territory independence.

Lebanese Civil War
During the Lebanese Civil War, France was an active member in the creation of the United Nations Interim Force in Lebanon and voted in favor of numerous UN Resolutions regarding Lebanon such as Resolution 501, Resolution 508, Resolution 511, Resolution 511, Resolution 594 and Resolution 599. France was also a member of the Multinational Force in Lebanon and in 1982, during Operation Épaulard I, headquartered from the Beirut Internal Airport, French Armed Forces and Paratroopers were sent to the coastal parts of West Beirut and the seaport to ensure peace in those regions. From 1982 to 1984, France was tasked with training the Lebanese Armed Forces. During that same period, France lost more than 89 soldiers out of which 58 French Paratroopers were killed in the 1983 Beirut barracks bombings.

Post civil war

After 1990, France continued to give Lebanon a modest military assistance. Since the end of the Lebanese civil war, relations between both nations have improved and strengthened. With regards to policy of cooperation and development between both nations, there are five main objectives: the consolidation of the rule of law, economic and social development, protection of the environment and heritage, university cooperation and research, cultural exchanges and the debate of ideas. There have been numerous high-level visits between leaders of both nations. After the Cedar Revolution in 2005, Syria withdrew its troops from the country. In April 2009, French and Lebanese officials approved the framework of a security agreement that besides improving bilateral relations include drugs and arms trafficking, illegal immigration and cyber-crime.

On 4 November 2017, Lebanese Prime Minister Saad Hariri resigned in a televised statement from Saudi Arabia, citing Iran's and Hezbollah's political over-extension in the Middle East region and fears of assassination. Later that month, with the intervention by French President Emmanuel Macron, Hariri was allowed to leave Saudi Arabia (where he also holds citizenship) and travelled to Paris. On 5 December 2017, Hariri rescinded his resignation and stated:

All (the government’s) political components decided to dissociate themselves from all conflicts, disputes, wars or the internal affairs of brother Arab countries, in order to preserve Lebanon’s economic and political relations.

French President Emmanuel Macron's intervention was aimed in part to put pressure on Saudi Arabia and Iran to desist from interference in Lebanon. Later on, President Macron visited Lebanon following the 2020 Beirut explosion.

Migration
Since the French Mandate of Lebanon, several thousands Lebanese immigrated to France. Initially, most Lebanese people who migrated to France were Christians. However, most of those who migrate from Lebanon to France are now Muslim. Many left Lebanon due to religious tension in the country and due to the civil wars and invasion from Israel into the country. There are over 200,000 people of Lebanese origin currently residing in France today.

Transportation
There are direct flights between France and Lebanon with the following airlines: Aigle Azur, Air France, Middle East Airlines and Transavia France.

Trade
In 2016, trade between France and Lebanon totaled €934 million. France is one of Lebanon's main trading partners, and more than 4,500 French companies export to Lebanon. In 2015, French direct investment in Lebanon totaled €534 million. Nearly a hundred French companies operate in Lebanon in various sectors such as in the agricultural, telecommunications, retail, petroleum industry and financial services.

Resident diplomatic missions
 France has an embassy in Beirut.
 Lebanon has an embassy in Paris and a consulate-general in Marseille.

See also 
 French mandate of Lebanon
 French language in Lebanon
 French people in Lebanon
 Grand Lycée Franco-Libanais
 Lebanese people in France
 List of Ambassadors of France to Lebanon
 Lycée Franco-Libanais Habbouche-Nabatieh

References

Bibliography 
 Marc Baronnet, Les relations franco-libanaises, 1997, published in 2008 by Lulu.com, .

External links
  Relations Franco-Libanaises sur le site du Ministère des Affaires étrangères et des Émigrants
  Page sur le Liban sur le site FRANCE diplomatie 
  History of France-Lebanon

 
Lebanon
Bilateral relations of Lebanon
Relations of colonizer and former colony